NGC 7714 is a spiral galaxy in the constellation Pisces. It was discovered by John Herschel on 18 September 1830.

NGC 7714 and NGC 7715 are interacting galaxies. The pair are also known as Arp 284.  NGC 7714 appears to be a highly distorted spiral, possibly a barred spiral galaxy. NGC 7715 is of uncertain type, probably an edge-on spiral or an irregular galaxy.

Supernova 1999dn was observed in NGC 7714 on September 19, 1999.

References

External links

Barred spiral galaxies
Pisces (constellation)
7714
12699
71868
284
Interacting galaxies